This is the discography of English singer Alma Cogan.

Albums

Studio albums

Compilation albums

EPs

Singles

Notes

References

Discographies of British artists
Pop music discographies